Jowzar (also Romanized as Jowzār) is a village in Sardshir Rural District, in the Central District of Buin va Miandasht County, Isfahan Province, Iran. At the 2006 census, its population was 71, in 18 families.

References 

Populated places in Buin va Miandasht County